Alhambra Theatorium (also known as The Alhambra Theater) is a historic movie theater in the Haynies Corner Arts District of Evansville, Indiana. It was designed by Frank J. Schlotter and opened on September 27, 1913, as a movie theater. The Alhambra was one of many influenced by the Alhambra Palace in Spain. Although Alhambra theatres opened all over the world, only a traditional playhouse built in New York in 1905 predates Evansville's in the United States.

The theatre cost $18,000 to build and was one of the largest movie theatres in Evansville at the time. It included a cigar shop and a confectionery, and spurred new business in the area now designated as the Haynies Corner Arts District. The theater ceased operation in 1956.

The Alhambra has been renovated a few times in the past 100 years and is in the process of being restored.  It was placed on the National Register of Historic Places in 1979.

References

National Register of Historic Places in Evansville, Indiana
Buildings and structures in Evansville, Indiana
Cinemas and movie theaters in Indiana
Theatres on the National Register of Historic Places in Indiana